Alfred Keller  (19 September 1882 – 11 February 1974) was a general in the Luftwaffe of Nazi Germany during the Second World War who commanded the Luftflotte 1. His career in the Imperial German Armed Forces began in 1897; he served as a bomber pilot in World War I.

Keller died in Berlin. He was buried at the Waldfriedhof Zehlendorf.

Awards 
 Iron Cross (1914), II. and I. Class
 House Order of Hohenzollern, Knights' Cross with Swords 
 Bavarian Military Merit Order, 4th Class with swords and crown 
 General Honour Decoration for Bravery (Hesse)
 Pilot’s Badge German Empire
 Pour le Mérite (4 December 1917)
 Honour Cross of the World War 1914/1918
 Wehrmacht Long Service Award 4th to 2nd Class
 Combined Pilots-Observation Badge in Gold with Diamonds
 Clasp to the Iron Cross II. and I. Class 
 Front Flying Clasp of the Luftwaffe
 Knight's Cross of the Iron Cross on 24 June 1940 as General der Flieger and commanding general of the IV. Fliegerkorps
 Grand Cross with Swords of the Order of the White Rose of Finland (30 April 1942)

References

Citations

Bibliography

 
 
 
 
 
 
 
 
 
 
 
 
 

1882 births
1974 deaths
Colonel generals of the Luftwaffe
Luftwaffe World War II generals
Luftstreitkräfte personnel
Prussian Army personnel
German World War I pilots
Bomber pilots
Recipients of the Knight's Cross of the Iron Cross
Recipients of the Pour le Mérite (military class)
Recipients of the clasp to the Iron Cross, 1st class
People from the Province of Westphalia
Burials at the Waldfriedhof Zehlendorf
Military personnel from Bochum